EV5 may refer to:

 EV5 Via Romea Francigena, a long-distance cycling route in Europe
 Alpha 21164, a microprocessor known by its code name, EV5
 (341843) 2008 EV5, an asteroid